Joe McLean may refer to:
 Joe McLean (cyclist)
 Joe McLean (ice hockey)

See also
 Joe McClean, American screenwriter, director and producer
 Joe McClean (rugby league)